Alexis Angelo Podchernikoff (1912-1987) was an American lithographer. His work is at the Fine Arts Museums of San Francisco.

References

1912 births
1987 deaths
American lithographers
20th-century lithographers